In Greek mythology, Leucaspis was a Sicani prince who entered into combat with Heracles when he passed through Sicily, on return from the country of Geryon.

In the combat Leucaspis died along with a great number of noble compatriots, and he became a cult.

Notes

Princes in Greek mythology
Mythology of Heracles
Sicilian characters in Greek mythology